"Comme un cœur froid" (meaning "Like a Frozen Heart") is the fourth single from Celine Dion's album Incognito, released on 25 January 1988 in Quebec, Canada. The song became a hit reaching number 1 in Quebec for two weeks. It entered the chart on 6 February 1988 and spent twenty four weeks on it.

Background
A music video was made for the Incognito TV special which aired in September 1987. It was produced by Canadian Broadcasting Corporation and directed by Jacques Payette.

Thanks to "Comme un cœur froid", Jean Roussel won the Félix Award for Arranger of the Year.

Track listings and formats
Canadian 7" single
"Comme un cœur froid" (Edit) – 4:10
"Ma chambre" – 4:00

Charts

See also
Félix Award

References

External links

1987 songs
1988 singles
CBS Records singles
Celine Dion songs
French-language songs
Songs written by Eddy Marnay
Songs written by Jean Roussel